A particle in the physical sciences is a small localized object to which can be ascribed physical properties.

Particle may also refer to:

Science

 Particle (ecology), in marine and freshwater ecology, a small object
 Colloidal particle, part of a one-phase system of two or more components where the particles aren't individually visible
 Particle, the solid or liquid particles in an aerosol
 Granular material
 Particulates, in the areas of atmospheric physics and air pollution
 Nanoparticle, an object between 1 and 100 nanometers that behaves as a whole unit
 Point particle, or point mass, an idealization of an object with finite mass but of zero size
 A particle of a medium in continuum mechanics, meaning an infinitesimal portion of it.
 Self-propelled particles, a concept used in statistical physics to model swarms
 Subatomic particle:
 Elementary particle, or fundamental particle, a particle of which other particles are composed
 Particle physics, the study of subatomic particles
 See list of particles for more uses
 Suspended solids, in a liquid

Arts, entertainment, and media
 Particle (band), a 2000 jam band from Los Angeles, California
 Particle (film), a 2012 Turkish film
 Particles (film), a 2019 French film
 "Particles" (song), a 2021 single by Jessica Simpson

Computing
 Particle, a US HTML5 web app company acquired by Apple in 2012
 Particle system, in computer graphics, a technique to simulate certain fuzzy phenomena

Other uses
 Grammatical particle, a function word

See also 
Particulate (disambiguation)
 Particle size (disambiguation)